Banjšice (or Bainsizza Santo Spirito) is a settlement in western Slovenia in the Municipality of Nova Gorica. It has a population of 264. It is located on the high Banjšice Plateau, overlooking the Soča Valley. It is made up of several hamlets, including Breg, Lohke, Ošlakarji, Mrcinje, Trušnje, Podlešče, Raven, Kuščarji, and Krvavec.

The parish church in the settlement is dedicated to the Holy Spirit and belongs to the Diocese of Koper.

References

External links
Banjšice on Geopedia

Populated places in the City Municipality of Nova Gorica